The men's large hill team ski jumping competition for the 1994 Winter Olympics was held in Lysgårdsbakken. It took place on 22 February.

Results

References

Ski jumping at the 1994 Winter Olympics